Dwarfgoby or dwarf goby can refer to members of goby genera characterized by their small sizes. These include:
Eviota
Knipowitschia
Pandaka
Trimma
Trimmatom

See also
Pandaka pygmaea, the dwarf pygmy goby